An infrared telescope is a telescope that uses infrared light to detect celestial bodies. Infrared light is one of several types of radiation present in the electromagnetic spectrum.

All celestial objects with a temperature above absolute zero emit some form of electromagnetic radiation. In order to study the universe, scientists use several different types of telescopes to detect these different types of emitted radiation in the electromagnetic spectrum.  Some of these are gamma ray, x-ray, ultra-violet, regular visible light (optical), as well as infrared telescopes.

Leading discoveries 
There were several key developments that led to the invention of the infrared telescope:
 In 1800, William Herschel discovered infrared radiation.
 In 1878, Samuel Pierpoint Langley created the first bolometer. This was a very sensitive instrument that could electrically detect incredibly small changes in temperature in the infrared spectrum.
 Thomas Edison used an alternative technology, his tasimeter, to measure heat in the sun's corona during the solar eclipse of July 29, 1878.
 In the 1950s, scientists used lead-sulfide detectors to detect the infrared radiation from space. These detectors were cooled with liquid nitrogen.
 Between 1959 and 1961, Harold Johnson created near-infrared photometers which allowed scientists to measure thousands of stars.
 In 1961, Frank Low invented the first germanium bolometer. This invention, cooled by liquid helium, led the way for current infrared telescope development.

Infrared telescopes may be ground-based, air-borne, or space telescopes. They contain an infrared camera with a special solid-state infrared detector which must be cooled to cryogenic temperatures.

Ground-based telescopes were the first to be used to observe outer space in infrared.  Their popularity increased in the mid-1960s.  Ground-based telescopes have limitations because water vapor in the Earth's atmosphere absorbs infrared radiation.  Ground-based infrared telescopes tend to be placed on high mountains and in very dry climates to improve visibility.

In the 1960s, scientists used balloons to lift infrared telescopes to higher altitudes. With balloons, they were able to reach about  up. In 1967, infrared telescopes were placed on rockets. These were the first air-borne infrared telescopes. Since then, aircraft like the Kuiper Airborne Observatory (KAO) have been adapted to carry infrared telescopes. A more recent air-borne infrared telescope to reach the stratosphere was NASA's Stratospheric Observatory for Infrared Astronomy (SOFIA) in May 2010. Together, United States scientists and the German Aerospace Center scientists placed a 17-ton infrared telescope on a Boeing 747 jet airplane.

Placing infrared telescopes in space completely eliminates the interference from the Earth's atmosphere.  One of the most significant infrared telescope projects was the Infrared Astronomical Satellite (IRAS) that launched in 1983.  It revealed information about other galaxies, as well as information about the center of our galaxy the Milky Way. NASA presently has solar-powered spacecraft in space with an infrared telescope called the Wide-field Infrared Survey Explorer (WISE).  It was launched on December 14, 2009.

Selective comparison

The wavelength of visible light is about 0.4 μm to 0.7 μm, and 0.75 μm to 1000 μm (1 mm) is a typical range for infrared astronomy, far-infrared astronomy, to submillimetre astronomy.

Infrared telescopes
Ground based :
 Infrared Telescope Facility, Hawaii, 1979–
 Gornergrat Infrared Telescope, 1979–2005
 Infrared Optical Telescope Array, 1988–2006
 United Kingdom Infrared Telescope, 1979–
 Wyoming Infrared Observatory, 1977-
Airborne:
 Kuiper Airborne Observatory (KAO), 1974-1995
Stratospheric Observatory for Infrared Astronomy (SOFIA), 2010-2022
Space based:
 Infrared Astronomical Satellite, 1983
 Spitzer Space Telescope, 2003-2020
 Herschel Space Observatory, 2009-2013
 Wide-field Infrared Survey Explorer (WISE), 2009-
 Nancy Grace Roman Space Telescope (formerly WFIRST)
 James Webb Space Telescope (JWST), 2021-

See also
 Infrared astronomy
 List of largest infrared telescopes
 List of telescope types

Notes

 
Telescope types
Infrared imaging